is a park located in Toki, Gifu Prefecture, Japan.

Sogi Onsen (Baden Park SOGI) is adjacent.

Overview 

 In the park there are around 300 trees including Japanese maple, maple, ginkgo biloba, Japanese hemlock, and giant dogwood, as well as variously sized ponds.
 In fall, the foliage of the trees and shrubs is reflected in the ponds, and one can see "inverted fall foliage". This inverted fall foliage has been  at night every year since 1999.
 As a famous spot for fall foliage, it was selected to be in "" in 2004, and the "" in 2010.
 This park is close to the border with Aichi Prefecture. If one continues on  towards Aichi for about 2 kilometers, they will enter the city of Toyota (formerly Obara).

Access 

 Get off at the Baden Park SOGI bus stop on the  Toki Nanboku Line on weekdays, or the Donburi Kaikan Baden Park Line on weekends.
 In the fall foliage season there may also be a temporary bus that runs from Tokishi Station.

References

External links 

 Sogi Park Momiji Light-Up

Toki, Gifu
Parks and gardens in Gifu Prefecture